World Cricket Championship (WCC) is a series of 3D cricket mobile games developed by Nextwave Multimedia. There have been four WCC games released so far. WCC, the first game of the WCC franchise, was launched and released in 2011, with WCC2 released in 2015, WCC Rivals in 2019, and WCC3 in 2020. It is one of the largest mobile-based cricket simulation with around 10.7 million monthly users, and has an average of over 2.1 million daily active users. It is one of the most downloaded cricket game franchises in the world. 

In 2016, WCC2 was released on the Microsoft Store for Windows.

WCC 
The first game in the World Cricket Championship franchise, WCC, was officially released in 2011.

WCC2 
WCC2 was officially released in 2015 and is a sequel to WCC. This game has two commentary options, Hindi and English. Being an advanced version of WCC, WCC 2 had player customization whereby users could customize player names, jersey numbers, and faces, as well as changing the squads of both teams in a match. The game features 18 international teams, 42 cricket stadiums, and all three formats of cricket (Test, ODI and T20). The game features 11 different tournaments which include: National Premier League (based on the Indian Premier League), ODI bilateral series, and the Asian Cup. WCC2 also consists of live cricket features such as Hot events (which feature ongoing, bilateral, cricket series) and social modules such as Gangs of Cricket and Challenge a Friend. WCC 2 also features 3 multiplayer formats (offline multiplayer, online multiplayer, and batting multiplayer).

WCC Rivals 
WCC Rivals was launched in 2019 as the third game in the WCC franchise after WCC and WCC2. It was the first fully featured real-time multiplayer cricket game on mobile. On 6 February 2020, WCC Rivals introduced 2v2 multiplayer, which eventually became the first ever mobile game to feature 2v2 real-time cricket multiplayer.

WCC3 
WCC3 is the fourth installment of the World Cricket Championship franchise. The game was announced in November 2019 and the beta version was made available in May 2020. The game was officially launched in September 2020. It includes professional commentary from various former cricketers in seven languages: Matthew Hayden and Isa Guha for English, Aakash Chopra and Anjum Chopra for Hindi, Venkatapathy Raju for Telugu, Deep Dasgupta for Bengali, Vijay Bharadwaj for Kannada, Abhinav Mukund for Tamil, and Tariq Saeed for Urdu. This game also included a new feature of players health which decrease 5% after every match. 

WCC3 introduced a new Career Mode which allowed for the creation of custom squads. This feature was also added later to WCC2.

References 

2011 video games
Short form cricket
Cricket video games
Mobile games
Video games developed in India